Margules is a surname that, like its variants shown below, is derived from the Ashkenazi Hebrew pronunciation of the Hebrew word  (Israeli Hebrew [maɹgali'jot]), meaning 'pearls,' and may refer to:

 Ludwik Margules, film director
 Max Margules, Austrian scholar
 De Hirsh Margules, Romanian-American painter

See also 
 Margules function
 Margolies
 Margolis
 Margulis
 Margulies
 Margolus

Jewish surnames
Hebrew-language surnames